The Ministry of Foreign Affairs, abbreviated KLN, is a ministry of the Government of Malaysia that is responsible for foreign affairs, Malaysian diaspora, foreigners in Malaysia, diplomacy, foreign relations, counter terrorism, bilateral affairs, multilateral affairs, ASEAN, international protocol, consular services, maritime affairs, chemical weapons. The current ministry is based in Putrajaya. The Ministry of Foreign Affairs Malaysia is also widely known as Wisma Putra, which is also the name of its building in Putrajaya.

Organisation 
Minister of Foreign Affairs
Deputy Minister
Secretary-General
Under the Authority of Secretary-General
Legal Division
Internal Audit Unit
Integrity Unit
Deputy Secretary-General (Bilateral Affairs)
Europe Division
Americas Division
Africa Division
West Asia Division
East Asia Division
South and Central Asia Division
Cambodia, Laos, Myanmar and Vietnam (CLMV) and Oceania Division
South East Asia Division
Communications and Public Diplomacy Division
Corporate Communication Unit
Deputy Secretary-General (Multilateral Affairs)
Human Rights and Humanitarian Division
Organisation of Islamic Cooperation (OIC) and Regional Cooperation Division
Multilateral Economics and Environment Division
Multilateral Political Division
Multilateral Security and International Organizations Division
International Cooperation and Development Division
Deputy Secretary-General (Management Services)
Administration and Security Division
Human Resource Management Division
Finance Division
Development Division
Inspectorate Division
Information and Communication Technology Division
Account Division
Director-General of Asean-Malaysia National Secretariat
Asean Political-Security Community Division
Asean Economic Community Division
Asean Socio-Cultural Community Division
Asean External Relation Division
Chief of Protocol and Consular
Protocol Division
Consular Division
Director-General of Policy Planning and Coordination
Policy and Strategic Planning Division
Coordination and Performance Evaluation Division
Director-General of Maritime Affairs
Director-General of Institute of Diplomacy and Foreign Relations
Director-General of Southeast Asia Regional Centre for Counter-Terrorism
Chairman of National Authority for Chemical Weapons Convention
Heads of Mission (112 Missions)

Federal departments 
 Department of Bilateral Affairs, or Jabatan Hubungan Dua Hala. (Official site)
 Department of Multilateral Affairs, or Jabatan Hubungan Pelbagai Hala. (Official site)
 Department of Management Services, or Jabatan Pengurusan Perkhidmatan. (Official site)
 Department of Protocol and Consular, or Jabatan Protokol dan Konsular. (Official site)
 Department of Policy Planning and Coordination, or Jabatan Perancangan Dasar dan Strategi. (Official site)
 Department of Maritime Affairs, or Jabatan Hal Ehwal Maritim. (Official site)

Federal agencies 
 Asean-Malaysia National Secretariat, or Sekretariat Kebangsaan Asean-Malaysia. (Official site)
 Institute of Diplomacy and Foreign Relations (IDFR), or Institut Diplomasi dan Hubungan Luar Negeri. (Official site)
 Southeast Asia Regional Centre for Counter-Terrorism (SEARCCT), or Pusat Serantau Asia Tenggara bagi Mencegah Keganasan. (Official site)
 National Authority for Chemical Weapons Convention (CWC), or Pihak Berkuasa Kebangsaan Konvensyen Senjata Kimia. (Official site)

Key legislation 
The Ministry of Foreign Affairs is responsible for administration of several key Acts:

History 
The origin of the Ministry of Foreign Affairs began before Malaysia's independence in 1957. The groundwork for the establishment of the Ministry of External Affairs (MEA), as it was initially called, was initiated a year prior to Independence particularly with through the training of a batch of eleven diplomats to man the country's diplomatic missions overseas. This pioneering group was trained in the United Kingdom and Australia.

The Ministry of External Affairs was modeled after the British Foreign Office.

Initially, Malaysia had diplomatic missions in London, New York City with a concurrent office in Washington D.C., Canberra, New Delhi, Jakarta and Bangkok. In 1963, there were fourteen Malaysian missions and twenty-five countries were represented in Malaysia (four by way of concurrent accreditation).

In 1965, the diplomatic machinery of Malaysia faced its first major reorganisation. In 1966, there was an accelerated growth pattern of the Foreign Ministry particularly with regard to the personnel and the financial allocation for its activities. That year also witnessed a change in the designation of MEA to the preferred terminology of "Ministry of Foreign Affairs" and also saw the physical relocation and consolidation of the Ministry. From its original premises at the Sultan Abdul Samad Building, the Ministry moved to Wisma Putra. The Wisma Putra Complex is based on a combination of both traditional and modern architecture.

Functions 
The Ministry of Foreign Affairs bears the mandate and responsibility to conduct Malaysia's foreign relations with other countries. This includes matters related to political relations, economic affairs, security matters, and social and cultural promotion. The Ministry is geared towards fulfilling its role and functions:
upholding, protecting and promoting Malaysia's sovereignty, territorial integrity and national interests;
monitoring and analysing regional and global developments;
developing and advising the Government on foreign policy options;
coordinating a coherent position on international issues with other Ministries and Agencies;
providing consular services and assistance within the limits permitted by international law;
articulating the Government's foreign policy positions; and
facilitating other Ministries and Agencies in their international engagement.

Legal Framework 
The External Affairs Legislations that fall within the purview of the Ministry of Foreign Affairs are:

Diplomatic and Consular Officers (Oaths and Fees) Act 1959 (Revised 1988) [Act 348];
Diplomatic Privileges (Vienna Convention) Act 1966 [Act 636];
Consular Relations (Vienna Convention) Act 1999 [Act 595];
Foreign Representative (Privileges and Immunities) Act 1967 (Revised 1995) [Act 541];
International Organisations (Privileges and Immunities) Act 1992 [Act 485]; and
Chemical Weapons Convention Act 2005 [Act 641].
 
In addition, the Federal Constitution allows Parliament to make laws related to external affairs that include:

Treaties, agreements and conventions with other countries and all matters which bring the Federation into relations with any other country;
Implementation of treaties, agreements and conventions with other countries;
Diplomatic, consular and trade representation;
International organisations; participation in international bodies and implementation of decisions taken thereat;
Extradition, fugitive offenders; admission into, and emigration and expulsion from, the Federation;
Passports, visas, permits of entry or other certificates, quarantine; 
Foreign and extraterritorial jurisdiction; and
Pilgrimage to places outside Malaysia.

See also 
 Minister of Foreign Affairs (Malaysia)
 Deputy Minister of Foreign Affairs (Malaysia)

References

External links 

 
Malaysia
Foreign relations of Malaysia
Federal ministries, departments and agencies of Malaysia
Malaysia, Foreign Affairs